Vardø Radio is a coast radio station at Vardø, Norway. Operated by Telenor Maritim Radio, it is responsible for Barents Sea coast between Tromsø and the Norway–Russia border. It was established in 1923 and is jointly located with Vardø Vessel Traffic Service Centre.

References

Coast radio stations in Norway
Vardø
Barents Sea
1923 establishments in Norway